Abu or ABU may refer to:

Places
 Abu (volcano), a volcano on the island of Honshū in Japan
 Abu, Yamaguchi, a town in Japan
 Ahmadu Bello University, a university located in Zaria, Nigeria
 Atlantic Baptist University, a Christian university located in Moncton, New Brunswick, Canada
 Elephantine, Egypt, known as Abu to the Ancient Egyptians
 A. A. Bere Tallo Airport (IATA: ABU), in Atambua, Indonesia
 Mount Abu, the highest mountain in the Indian state of Rajasthan

People
 Abu (Arabic term), a component of some Arabic names
 Ab (Semitic), a common part of Arabic-derived names, meaning "father of" in Arabic
 Abu al-Faraj (disambiguation)
 Abu Baker Asvat, a murdered South African activist and medical doctor
 Abu Ibrahim (disambiguation)
 Abu Mohammed (disambiguation)
 Abu Salim (disambiguation)
Abdul-Malik Abu (born 1995), American basketball player in the Israeli Premier Basketball League
 Raneo Abu, Filipino politician

Other uses
 Abu (god), a minor god of vegetation in Sumerian mythology
 ABU Garcia, a Swedish producer of sport fishing equipment
 Abu language (disambiguation)
 Abure language (ISO 639: ABU), a Tano language of Ivory Coast
 African Boxing Union, African boxing organization which awards continental titles
 Airman Battle Uniform, a utility uniform of the United States Air Force
 Asia-Pacific Broadcasting Union
 Asymptomatic bacteriuria, bacteria in the urine without signs of a urinary tract infection
 Abu, character in a series of animated anti-fascist propaganda short films produced by Halas & Batchelor for the British Ministry of Information from 1943 to 1945
 A character in the Disney Aladdin franchise
 The fifth month of the Babylonian calendar

See also
 
 Apu (disambiguation)
 A Bu, Chinese jazz pianist, born as Dai Liang

Arabic masculine given names